Bow is a hamlet contiguous with Stanford in the Vale in Oxfordshire, England.

External links

Villages in Oxfordshire